Noble Jacob Johnson (August 23, 1887 – March 17, 1968) was a United States representative from Indiana and an Associate Judge and Chief Judge of the United States Court of Customs and Patent Appeals.

Education and career

Born in Terre Haute, Indiana, Johnson attended the public schools. After reading law to be admitted to the bar in 1911, he commenced practice in Terre Haute from 1911 to 1917. He was a deputy prosecuting attorney for the forty-third judicial circuit of Indiana in 1917 and 1918. He served as prosecuting attorney for the same judicial circuit from 1921 to 1924.

Congressional service

Johnson was elected as a Republican to the Sixty-ninth, Seventieth, and Seventy-first Congresses (March 4, 1925 – March 3, 1931). He was an unsuccessful candidate for reelection in 1930 to the Seventy-second Congress, and for election in 1936 to the Seventy-fifth Congress. However, he was elected to the Seventy-sixth and to the four succeeding Congresses and served from January 3, 1939, until his resignation on July 1, 1948.

Federal judicial service

Johnson was nominated by President Harry S. Truman on May 28, 1948, to a seat on the United States Court of Customs and Patent Appeals vacated by Judge Oscar E. Bland. He was confirmed by the United States Senate on June 8, 1948, and received his commission on June 10, 1948. His service terminated on July 19, 1956, due to his elevation to be Chief Judge of the same court.

Johnson was nominated by President Dwight D. Eisenhower on May 17, 1956, to a seat on the United States Court of Customs and Patent Appeals vacated by Judge Finis J. Garrett. He was confirmed by the United States Senate on July 19, 1956, and received his commission the same day. He assumed senior status on August 7, 1958. Johnson was initially appointed as a Judge under Article I, but the court was raised to Article III status by operation of law on August 25, 1958, and Johnson thereafter served as an Article III Judge. His service terminated on March 17, 1968, due to his death.

Death

Johnson died on March 17, 1968, in Washington, D.C., where he had resided since his judicial appointment. He was interred in Bethesda Cemetery, West Terre Haute, Indiana.

References

Sources

 

1887 births
1968 deaths
Judges of the United States Court of Customs and Patent Appeals
Politicians from Terre Haute, Indiana
United States Article I federal judges appointed by Harry S. Truman
20th-century American judges
United States federal judges admitted to the practice of law by reading law
United States Article I federal judges appointed by Dwight D. Eisenhower
Washington, D.C., Republicans
Republican Party members of the United States House of Representatives from Indiana